The men's 1500 metres event at the 1999 Summer Universiade was held at the Estadio Son Moix in Palma de Mallorca, Spain on 10, 11 and 13 July.

Medalists

Results

Heats

Semifinals

Final

References

Athletics at the 1999 Summer Universiade
1999